Dominic James Robert Jermey  (born 26 April 1967) is a British diplomat who is presently a director-general at the Foreign, Commonwealth & Development Office.  His immediately previous position was Director-General of the Zoological Society of London. He served as British Ambassador to Afghanistan from 2016 to 2017.

Early life and work
Jermey was educated at Tonbridge School and then Clare College, Cambridge, before working at J. H. Schroder Wagg & Co. in corporate finance in 1990.

Consular career
Joining the Foreign and Commonwealth Office in 1993, Jermey served in London in the European Union Department, at the Embassy in Islamabad, in East Timor liaising with the United Nations, and in London at the United Nations Department, before in 2001 becoming the interim Chargé d’Affaires at the new British office in Kabul. Jermey was appointed an Officer of the Order of the British Empire in 2001.

Following Kabul, after some time working in consular affairs, Jermey moved to work at UK Trade & Investment. He did this first in 2004 as Deputy Head of Mission in Madrid and UKTI Director there, interrupted by a two-month return to consular work to head the team at the British Embassy in Thailand following the 2004 Indian Ocean earthquake and tsunami. After Madrid, in 2007 Jermey served as UKTI's Managing Director for the Sectors Group, including briefly as head of their Defence and Security Organisation in 2008, and as the acting Chief Executive in 2009.

In 2010, Jermey was appointed Her Majesty's Ambassador to the United Arab Emirates, based in Abu Dhabi, succeeding Edward Oakden. Jermey was appointed as a Commander of the Royal Victorian Order in November 2010 following the state visit of Elizabeth II to the UAE.

Following his tour there, Jermey was replaced by Philip Parham and was appointed as the Chief Executive of UK Trade & Investment in 2014. The next year he was poached by the Foreign Office to be their new International Counter-Extremism Coordinator, and was replaced by Dr. Catherine Raines.

After a year working on Counter-Extremism, Jermey was again appointed ambassador, this time back to Kabul as Her Majesty's Ambassador to Afghanistan in 2016, succeeding Dame Karen Pierce. At the end of the next year, Jermey was replaced by Sir Nicholas Kay and took up his appointment at ZSL following on from the 13-year tenure of Ralph Armond.

References

External links 

 Jermey's entry on gov.uk.

Living people
1967 births
People educated at Tonbridge School
Alumni of Clare College, Cambridge
Ambassadors of the United Kingdom to the United Arab Emirates
Ambassadors of the United Kingdom to Afghanistan
Companions of the Order of St Michael and St George